Dastgerd Rural District may refer to:
 Dastgerd Rural District (Chaharmahal and Bakhtiari Province)
 Dastgerd Rural District (Sistan and Baluchestan Province)